China National Highway 206 (G206) runs from Weihai, Shandong Province to Shantou, Guangdong Province. It is 2,375 kilometres in length and runs south from Yantai, going via Shandong, Jiangsu, Anhui, Jiangxi Province, and ends in Guangdong Province.

Route and distance

See also 

 China National Highways

Transport in Anhui
Transport in Jiangsu
Transport in Shandong
Transport in Jiangxi
Transport in Guangdong
206